Caroline Crachami (1815 – June 1824) was the first person recognised to have primordial dwarfism. Sometimes cited as the smallest person in recorded history, she was nine years old or less at the time of her death, and it is unlikely that she had finished growing. Crachami was said to have been born in Palermo, Italy, and she was known as the "Sicilian Fairy" or "Sicilian Dwarf."

Exhibition and death
Crachami first came to public notice in April 1824, when she was exhibited in London by Dr. Gilligan, who initially claimed to be her father. She was a great success, attracting many distinguished visitors, and was presented at Court. Observers noted that she appeared of normal intelligence for a child of her supposed years, had a good command of spoken English, and suffered from a bad cough.

She died in June 1824, apparently of a respiratory ailment, probably tuberculosis. A week later her real father, Louis Emmanuel Crachami, a musician at the Theatre Royal, Dublin, arrived in London and began legal attempts to retrieve his daughter's body for burial. He claimed to have consulted Dr. Gilligan in Dublin about Caroline's health. Gilligan apparently prescribed a trip to a drier climate, and offered to take Caroline to London if he could exhibit her to cover the costs of the trip. After her death he attempted to sell her body for anatomisation, then left London with the proceeds of the exhibition. Despite Crachami's efforts, Caroline's body was acquired by the anatomist John Hunter, who dissected it. To this day, her skeleton is on display in the Hunterian Museum along with that of Charles Byrne, the "Irish Giant".

Doubts over her reported age
	
Studies of Caroline Crachami's skull in the 1950s put her dental age range at only 2 to 7 years old, a finding confirmed in 1998. It was suggested that Caroline was in fact 3 years old at her death, rather than 9, although contemporary reports of her abilities and language suggest an older child, and make this a matter for debate.

See also
 List of the verified shortest people

References

Sources
Wood, Gaby. The Smallest Of All Persons Mentioned In The Records Of Littleness. Profile, 1998, 
Richmond Review: The Smallest of All Persons
Caroline Crachami at Everything2.com

1815 births
1824 deaths
People from Palermo
People with dwarfism
Sideshow performers